The Neftchi Baku 2019–20 season was Neftchi Baku's 28th Azerbaijan Premier League season. Neftchi will compete Azerbaijan Premier League and in the Azerbaijan Cup and Europa League.

Season Events
At the end of the previous season, Petru Racu, Goran Paracki and Mahammad Mirzabeyov were all released by the club.

On 1 June, Salahat Aghayev signed a new two-year contract with Neftçi.

On 4 June, Neftçi announced their first signing of the summer, Vojislav Stanković signing a two-year contract on a free transfer from Gabala.

On 10 June, Neftçi released Ruslan Abışov from his contract by mutual consent, and announced the signing of Rauf Aliyev on a one-year contract from Gabala.

On 12 June, Neftçi released Gianluca Sansone from his contract by mutual consent.

On 14 June, Dário returned to Neftçi, signing a two-year contract from Daegu.

On 16 June, Steeven Joseph-Monrose signed for Neftçi on a two-year contract after his Gabala FK contract had expired on 4 June.

On 20 June, Mirabdulla Abbasov signed a new contract with Neftçi until the end of the summer of 2021, and simultaneously joined Sabail on loan for the 2019–20 season.

On 6 July, Namik Alaskarov and Rahman Hajiyev extended their contracts until the summer of 2021.

On 15 July, Kwame Karikari left Neftçi by mutual consent.

On 5 September, Wilde-Donald Guerrier signed a one-year contract with Neftçi.

On 2 January, Neftçi announced the signing of Ibrahim Aliyev from Sumgayit, with Rauf Aliyev being released on 8 January. On 10 January, Saman Nariman Jahan signed for Neftçi from Machine Sazi

On 18 January, Roberto Bordin was sacked as manager, with Fizuli Mammedov being placed in temporary charge.

On 13 March 2020, the Azerbaijan Premier League was postponed due to the COVID-19 pandemic.

On 1 June 2020, Neftçi announced that Anton Krivotsyuk had signed a new one-year contract with the club, 
 whilst Wilde-Donald Guerrier had left the club after his contract expired. Also on 1 June 2020, Emin Mahmudov extended his contract with Neftçi until May 2023, with Omar Buludov extended his contract with Neftçi until May 2021, and Kamran Ibrahimov extended his contract with Neftçi until May 2022 on 3 June.

On 19 June 2020, the AFFA announced that the 2019–20 season had been officially ended without the resumption of the remains matches due to the escalating situation of the COVID-19 pandemic in Azerbaijan, whilst Tural Akhundov and Soni Mustivar left the club after their contracts expired. The following day Neftçi also announced that Vangelis Platellas was leaving the club after his contract had expired.

Squad

Left club during season

Transfers

In

Out

Loans out

Released

Trial

Friendlies

Competitions

Azerbaijan Premier League

Results summary

Results by round

Results

League table

Azerbaijan Cup

UEFA Europa League

Qualifying rounds

Squad statistics

Appearances and goals

|-
|colspan="14"|Players away from Neftçi Baku on loan:
|-
|colspan="14"|Players who left Neftçi Baku during the season:

|}

Goal scorers

Clean sheets

Disciplinary record

References

External links 
 Official Website 

Neftçi PFK seasons
Azerbaijani football clubs 2019–20 season
Neftchi